Bartoo Island (also Baritoe Island) is an island in Priest Lake (in Bonner County, Idaho), owned by George Bartoo in the late 1800s. Campsites are available on the island.

References

Landforms of Bonner County, Idaho
Lake islands of Idaho